HMS Laforey was the lead ship of her class of destroyer built for the Royal Navy. Launched a year before the First World War began, she was attached to the Dover Patrol. Laforey saw action in several engagements with German torpedo boats, including the Battle off Noordhinder Bank and the action of 17 March 1917. Laforey was sunk in 1917 by a British mine after escorting several freighters to France.

Construction and design
On 29 March 1912, the British Admiralty placed orders for the first 16 destroyers of the L-class destroyer, (later to become the ). Four of these ships were ordered from Fairfield Shipbuilding and Engineering Company, including the lead ship, to be named Florizel. Florizel was laid down at Fairfield's Govan, Glasgow shipyard on 9 September 1912 and launched on 22 August 1913. On 30 September 1913, the Admiralty ordered that the L-class be renamed with names beginning with the letter "L", and Florizel was renamed Laforey. Laforey was completed in February 1914.

Displacement was  normal and  full load. Crew was 73 officers and men.

The ship's main gun armament consisted of three QF  Mk IV guns on the ship's centreline, with 120 rounds per gun. The ship carried two twin  21 inch (533 mm) torpedo tubes, and was fitted with rails to carry four Vickers Elia Mk IV naval mines, although these rails were never used.

Service
On commissioning, Laforey joined the 3rd Destroyer Flotilla as part of the First Fleet. On the outbreak of the First World War this Flotilla became part of the Harwich Force, under the overall command of Commodore Reginald Tyrwhitt.

On 28 August 1914, Tyrwhitt led the Harwich Force, including the 3rd Destroyer Flotilla and Laforey, on a sortie into the southeastern part of the North Sea near the German Coast, known as the Heligoland Bight in an attempt to ambush German cruisers and destroyers. This developed into the Battle of Heligoland Bight where three German cruisers (and ) and one destroyer (V187) was sunk at the cost of damage to the British cruiser  and three destroyers (and ). Laforey  was undamaged in the action.

On 23 January 1915, Laforey took part in another sortie of the Harwich Force, which together with the Battlecruiser Force under Admiral David Beatty, was to intercept a raid by German Battlecruisers which the Admiralty had been warned by decoded German radio signals. This resulted in the Battle of Dogger Bank, which took the form of a high speed chase of the German ships. The majority of the destroyers of the Harwich Force, including Laforey, were not fast enough to keep up with the battlecruisers. Only seven destroyers of the M class were fast enough to engage the German warships. On 1 May 1915, the old destroyer  was torpedoed and sunk by the German submarine  near the Goodwin Sands, and Laforey together with three sister ships (and ) were dispatched to search for the submarine, as were four naval trawlers. Two German torpedo boats,  and  attacked the trawlers in the Battle off Noordhinder Bank, sinking one (Columbia) before the four British destroyers arrived. Although the torpedo boats attempted to escape, the destroyers sank both German ships.

In October 1915, Laforey joined the 5th Destroyer Flotilla, part of the Mediterranean Fleet, helping to cover the evacuation from ANZAC Cove at the end of the Gallipoli Campaign on 19–20 December, helping to destroy stores left behind after the troops pulled out. She remained as part of the 5th Flotilla until February 1916.

Laforey then rejoined the Harwich Force, as part of the 9th Destroyer Flotilla, and was part of the escort for the seaplane carrier  when Vindex launched an unsuccessful air attack against the German Zeppelin base at Tondern on 25–25 March 1916. The Harwich Force was held back as a reserve during the Battle of Jutland on 31 May–1 June 1916, but when the battleship  was damaged by a German torpedo, Laforey was one of eight destroyers of the Harwich Force sent to escort the crippled battleship to the Humber.

In October 1916, Laforey was one of a division of destroyers detached to reinforce the Dover Patrol, reaching Dover on 24 October. Fearing an attack by German surface vessels against shipping in The Downs, against the Belgian coast or against the Dover Barrage, where anti-submarine nets were guarded by lightly armed trawlers, Vice-Admiral Reginald Bacon, commander of the Dover Patrol, ordered four destroyers, including Laforey,  to Dunkirk on 26 October. On that night the Germans launched an attack against the Dover Barrage and shipping in the Straits. One group of five German torpedo boats, the 18th Half Flotilla, was on the outward leg into the Straits of Dover when they sighted Laforey and companions sailing from Dover to Dunkirk. The British ships did not spot the German torpedo boats, which continued on their way unhindered. Later that night, other German torpedo boats attacked British drifters, and when the old destroyer  went to investigate, sank Flirt. As a response, Bacon ordered six Tribal-class destroyers from Dover and Laforeys division of four destroyers from Dunkirk to sortie out in an attempt to intercept the German ships. While Laforeys division sighted the gunfire of the engagement, they were too far off to intervene, with the German ships escaping with little damage.

Early in 1917, the 9th Destroyer Flotilla was split up, with the newer destroyers joining the 10th Destroyer Flotilla, and the L-class ships being dispersed to different units. Laforey joined the 6th Destroyer Flotilla as part of the Dover Patrol on 5 March 1917. On the night of 17–18 March 1917, Laforey was on patrol in the Dover Straits when the Germans launched another raid by torpedo boats. The destroyer  was torpedoed and sunk by the German warships. Laforey sighted an explosion and investigated, and on reaching a field of debris, started to search for survivors, signalling  to assist. Neither destroyer noticed that German torpedo boats were still in the vicinity, and two German ships,  and  launched torpedoes against the British ships, one striking and damaging Llewellyn while the German torpedo boats escaped unseen, with the British at first believing the attack had been by a submarine.

On 23 March 1917, Laforey, together with sister ships ,  and the destroyer , were escorting several cargo ships to France, using the Folkestone to Dieppe route. The merchant ships arrived safely, but at around 16:30, after the destroyers had begun the return trip, a large explosion occurred amidships on Laforey. The ship immediately broke in half, and the stern sank rapidly. The bow remained afloat for a short time before sinking, during which Laertes struggled to rescue survivors. Laforey had been sunk by a British-laid mine. Only 18 of the 76 aboard survived. The wreck lies about 10 miles south off Shoreham-by-Sea at approximately 50° 38.600' N  000° 13.800' W, and is a recreational dive site.

Citations

References

 
 
 
 
 
 
 
 
 
 

 

 

Laforey-class destroyers (1913)
Ships built in Govan
1913 ships
World War I destroyers of the United Kingdom
Maritime incidents in 1917
Ships sunk by mines
World War I shipwrecks in the English Channel
Wreck diving sites in the United Kingdom